The Association for Community Affiliated Plans (ACAP) is a national trade association representing 78 nonprofit health plans. Headquartered in Washington, D.C., ACAP advocates on behalf of its community-affiliated member health plans operating throughout the United States. ACAP's advocacy work focuses on representing publicly sponsored programs and health care providers who serve vulnerable populations. ACAP also promotes universal access to quality and cost-efficient care.

ACAP members are Medicaid-focused health plans that serve the safety net. Collectively, ACAP plans serve more than 20 million enrollees, which is over 50 percent of individuals enrolled in Medicaid-focused health plans.

History
In the 1980s, as Medicaid managed care expanded across the county, safety net providers, such as Community Health Centers (CHCs) and public hospitals, feared that managed care would reduce reimbursements for Medicaid-eligible services, making it more difficult for them to provide care to the un- and under-insured, and result in a loss of Medicaid volume, as beneficiaries would choose to see other providers once given a choice.

In response to these concerns, community health centers in at least 16 states banded together to establish their own managed care organizations. Often CHCs were the only sponsors, but in other cases, they joined with hospitals or other safety net providers to sponsor a health plan. These organizations were established to support both the financial viability of the CHCs and other sponsors, as well as to support the mission of care for the underserved.

In 2000, seventeen CHC-affiliated plans came together with the help of the US Health Resources and Services Administration to form the Association for Health Center Affiliated Health Plans (AHCAHP). In May 2001, the Board hired Meg Murray as its executive director. Later that year, the AHCAHP Board met in Portland, Oregon to develop a strategic plan to guide the work of the association over the next two years. AHCAHP’s vision, as developed during that meeting, was to improve the health of medically underserved populations through the development, survival, promotion and growth of CHC-affiliated health plans.

In October 2003, the Board agreed to expand full membership to like-minded, community-affiliated health plans that served a majority of members from public insurance programs and shared the same outlook as the existing AHCAHP plans. The name change to the Association for Community Affiliated Plans (ACAP) reflected the new mission and membership.

In 2007, ACAP worked with its member plans to expand their mission to include work on Medicare Special Needs Plans (SNPs.)

In 2019, ACAP began representing partner or associate plans that do not have a Medicaid contract but are nonprofit plans in the health insurance marketplace.

ACAP Member Plans

Arizona: Banner University Health Plans
California: Alameda Alliance for Health, CalOptima, CenCal Health, Central California Alliance for Health, Community Health Group, Contra Costa Health Plan, Gold Coast Health Plan, Health Plan of San Joaquin, Health Plan of San Mateo, Inland Empire Health Plan, Kern Family Health Care, L.A. Care Health Plan, Partnership HealthPlan of California, Santa Clara Family Health Plan, San Francisco Health Plan
Colorado: Denver Health
Connecticut: Community Health Network of Connecticut
DC: AmeriHealth Caritas District of Columbia, Health Care Services for Children with Special Needs
Delaware: AmeriHealth Caritas Delaware 
Florida: Community Care Plan, Prestige Health Choice
Hawaii: AlohaCare
Illinois: CountyCare
Indiana: MDwise
Louisiana: AmeriHealth Caritas Louisiana
Maryland: Priority Partners, Maryland Physicians Care
Massachusetts: Boston Medical Center HealthNet Plan, Commonwealth Care Alliance, Fallon Health Plan
Michigan: Blue Cross Complete of Michigan, Southwest Michigan Behavioral Health
Minnesota: Hennepin Health
New Hampshire: AmeriHealth Caritas New Hampshire, Well Sense Health Plan
New York: Amida Care, Elderplan & Homefirst, Hamaspik Choice, iCircle Care, Nascentia Health, VillageCareMAX, VNSNY CHOICE Health Plans
North Carolina: Alliance Health, AmeriHealth Caritas North Carolina, Partners Behavioral Health Management, Trillium Health Resources, Vaya Health
Ohio: CareSource
Oregon: CareOregon
Pennsylvania: AmeriHealth Caritas Pennsylvania, Geisinger Health Plan, UPMC for You
Rhode Island: Neighborhood Health Plan of Rhode Island
South Carolina: SelectHealth of South Carolina
Texas: Community First Health Plans, Community Health Choice, Cook Children's Health Plan, Driscoll Health Plan, El Paso First Health Plans, Parkland Community Health Plan, Texas Children's Health Plan
Utah: University of Utah Health Plans
Virginia: Virginia Premier Health Plan
Washington: Community Health Plan of Washington
Wisconsin: Children's Community Health Plan,

ACAP Partner/Associate Plans 

 Idaho: Mountain Health CO-OP
 Maine: Community Health Options
 Maryland: Maryland Community Health System
 Montana: Mountain Health CO-OP
 Texas: Sendero Health Plans
 Wisconsin: Common Ground Healthcare Cooperative
Wyoming: Mountain Health CO-OP

Notes

References

External links
 
 ACAP Staff

Managed care
Medical and health organizations based in Washington, D.C.
Organizations established in 2000
2000 establishments in the United States